Richard Clark may refer to:

 Richard Clark (dermatologist), American dermatologist
 Richard Clark (business executive) (born 1946), president of Merck
 Richard Clark (director), British television director
 Richard Auldon Clark, American conductor
 Richard Clark (musician) (1780–1856), English musician and writer
 Richard J. Clark (born 1939), American operatic baritone
 Richard M. Clark US Air Force General, first Black superintendent of the Air Force Academy

See also
 Dick Clark (disambiguation)
 Richard Clarke (disambiguation)
 Richard Clerke (disambiguation)
 Richard Yeoman-Clark, British composer and sound engineer